The 2000–01 National Football League, known for sponsorship reasons as the Church & General National Football League, was the 70th staging of the National Football League (NFL), an annual Gaelic football tournament for the Gaelic Athletic Association county teams of Ireland.

Mayo beat Galway in the final. In Division 2 Westmeath beat Cork final.

Format 
2 Divisions note due to Foot and Mouth there were some fixtures some Leinster and Ulster teams also London had to withdraw from later games meaning that in 2002 moving complete game to 1 year.

Results

Division 1

Division 1A Table

Division 1B Table

Finals

References

National Football League
National Football League
National Football League (Ireland) seasons